Van Winkle House may refer to:

New Jersey
 Van Winkle House (Franklin Lakes, New Jersey)
 Jacob W. Van Winkle House in Lyndhurst, New Jersey
 Van Winkle-Fox House in Oakland, New Jersey

West Virginia
 Peter G. Van Winkle House, now demolished, at 600 Juliana Street in Parkersburg, West Virginia
 Van Winkle-Wix House in Parkersburg, West Virginia, which still stands